Prince Vasily Anikitovich Repnin (Russian : Василий Аникитич Репнин; 1696–1748) was a Russian general.

Life
He was the son of prince Anikita Ivanovitch Repnin (1668-1726) and father of Nikolai Vasilyeich Repnin (1734-1801).

His military posts included commander in chief of the Russian Army during the War of the Austrian Succession (1740-1748) and governor-general of Saint Petersburg (1744). He also led the Rhine Campaign of 1748 and took part in negotiations for the Treaty of Aix-la-Chapelle. He died at Riga and was buried at St. Mary Magdalene's Church alongside his father.

1696 births
1748 deaths
Imperial Russian Army generals